The Ramlösa Open was a golf tournament on the Challenge Tour and the Telia Tour. It ran from 1987 to 1994 and was always played in Helsingborg, Sweden.

Winners

Notes

References

External links
Official coverage on the Challenge Tour's official site

Former Challenge Tour events
Golf tournaments in Sweden
Recurring sporting events established in 1987
Recurring sporting events disestablished in 1994
1987 establishments in Sweden
1994 disestablishments in Sweden